Below is a list of newspapers published in Croatia.

List of publications
National dailies
24sata (est. 2005, based in Zagreb; number one tabloid in the country in terms of circulation) 24sata.hr
Jutarnji list (est. 1998, based in Zagreb) jutarnji.hr
Novi list (est. 1900, based in Rijeka; the oldest Croatian newspaper still in existence) novilist.hr
Slobodna Dalmacija (est. 1943, based in Split) slobodnadalmacija.hr
Večernji list (est. 1959, based in Zagreb) vecernji.hr

Specialized dailies
Poslovni dnevnik (est. 2004, business and financial daily) poslovni.hr
Sportske novosti (est. 1945, based in Zagreb; sports daily) sportske.jutarnji.hr

Regional dailies
Glas Istre (based in Pula; covers Istria region) glasistre.hr
Glas Slavonije (based in Osijek; covers Slavonia) glas-slavonije.hr
Dubrovački vjesnik (based in Dubrovnik, covers the city and south Dalmatia) dubrovacki.hr
Zadarski list (based in Zadar, covers Zadar County) zadarskilist.hr

Weekly
Narodni list (est. 1862, based in Zadar) narodni-list.hr

Official gazette
Narodne novine (est. 1835, based in Zagreb) nn.hr

Publications in other languages
Novosti portalnovosti.com
La Voce del Popolo editfiume.com/lavoce

Historical and defunct

18th century
Agramer Deutsche Zeitung - published in 1786 by J. T. Trattner; based in Zagreb and published in German; no surviving copies have been found
Ephemerides Zagrabienses - the first newspaper ever published in Croatia, in 1771; published as a weekly in Zagreb by Antun Jandera; there are no surviving copies in existence
Kroatischer Korrespondent - established in 1789 and printed in German; the third newspaper published in Croatia and the oldest newspaper with a surviving copy

19th century
Crvena Hrvatska - in existence from 1890 to 1899, published by the Croatian Party of Rights in Dalmatia
Il Regio Dalmata – Kraglski Dalmatin - bilingual newspaper (in Italian and Croatian); first edition published in Zadar on 12 July 1806; the first newspaper printed in Croatian
Narodni list -  established in 1862; the oldest living newspaper in Croatia; its first issue was published on March 1, 1862, as a Croatian-language part of the Italian-language newspaper Il Nazionale
Novine Horvatske - established in 1835 by Ljudevit Gaj and printed in Croatian; in 1836 the paper switched from Kajkavian to Shtokavian dialect and was renamed Ilirske narodne novine; played an important role in the Illyrian movement

20th century
Feral Tribune – began as a political satire supplement in Slobodna Dalmacija daily in 1984; later evolved into an independent political weekly from 1993 onwards; folded in 2008
Republika – daily newspaper launched in late 2000 by media entrepreneur Ivo Pukanić, intended to compete with Europapress Holding's flagship daily Jutarnji list; folded after six months in May 2001
Slobodni tjednik – published 1990–1993, the first Croatian tabloid daily launched during the political turmoil in the early 1990s
Sportplus – published from December 2009 to March 2011 as a sports daily spun off from Novi list to compete with Sportske novosti; after 2011 merged back into Novi list
Vjesnik – published 1940–2012, major government-owned daily
Business.hr – published 2005–2014, business and financial daily, which competed against Poslovni dnevnik

See also
Media in Croatia
List of magazines in Croatia

Croatia

Newspapers